Ausserberg is a railway station in the Swiss canton of Valais and municipality of Ausserberg.

The station is served by the following passenger train:

A connecting PostAuto bus service links the station with Trogdorf village, Baltschieder and Visp.

Ausserberg station is an intermediate point of the Lötschberg South Ramp walking trail, which parallels the south ramp of the Lötschberg railway as it descends the northern flank of the Rhone valley into Brig.

Gallery

References

External links 

Railway stations in the canton of Valais
BLS railway stations